Hostafrancs is a Barcelona Metro station, named after the Hostafrancs neighbourhood, in the Sants-Montjuïc district of the city of Barcelona. The station is served by line L1. The station's name is still occasionally written as Hostafranchs, following the old Catalan spelling, chiefly in Spanish-language contexts.

The station is located under the Carrer de la Creu Coberta between the Carrer Moianès and Carrer Consell de Cent. The station can be accessed from entrances on all three streets.

Hostafrancs is on the original section of line L1 (then the Ferrocarril Metropolitano Transversal de Barcelona) between Catalunya and Bordeta stations, which was opened in 1926.

See also
List of Barcelona Metro stations

References

External links

Barcelona Metro line 1 stations
Railway stations in Spain opened in 1926
Transport in Sants-Montjuïc
Railway stations located underground in Spain